Wang Huan (born September 10, 1983 in Changchun, China) is a Chinese former figure skater. She is the 1999 Chinese national champion and 2000 National bronze medalist. She is a two-time competitor at ISU Championships, placing 18th at the 1998 World Junior Figure Skating Championships and 15th at the 2001 Four Continents Championships. She won bronze medals at the 1997 Asian Championships and 1998 Junior Grand Prix event in Beijing. She also placed 6th at the 1999 Asian Winter Games.

Results

External links
 

Chinese female single skaters
1983 births
Figure skaters from Changchun
Living people
Figure skaters at the 1999 Asian Winter Games